Camp Algiers was a World War II internment camp located in New Orleans, Louisiana. It currently serves as a U.S. Border Patrol station.

Development 
After the Pearl Harbor attack on December 7, 1941, distrust towards Western Europe and Japan began to increase. Paranoia among Americans increased after the discovery that more than 1 million Germans were fleeing to countries in Latin America. FBI agents were ordered by the Roosevelt administration to capture alleged Nazis in Latin America and deport them to internment camps across the southern states of the U.S. Almost 20 countries in Latin America assisted in capturing approximately 5,000 Germans who fled to their countries; however, many of the detainees were innocent. Not only were Nazis being captured and sent to the camps, so were Jews and Hitler resistors.

Controversy

Allegations 
Reports have shown that dictators in Latin America would accuse people of being Nazis to receive pay from the U.S. government. Some Latin American residents were accused and turned in by their government in order to gain their property and belongings.

Abuse 
At these internment camps, the U.S. government would allow the prisoners of war to fly their Swastika flags and sing Nazi songs at the camps in an effort to protect their freedom and welfare; however, due to the obligatory mix of opposing sides at the camps, this led to discrimination and attacks against the Jews who were held there. The National Refugee Service along with various Jewish organizations, when informed of the mistreatment of the Jewish and non-Jewish people, demanded that they be moved to Camp Algiers. Camp Algiers soon became known as 'the camp of the innocent' because about 81 Jews and non-Jews were sent there to escape harassment of Nazis at other camps. It contained a small library, musical instruments, and the residents were allowed to shop locally. The children were permitted to receive an education at Algiers elementary and high school.

Condemnation of internment camps 
Max Paul Friedman, a professor at American University, made a statement about the mistreatment of the Jews and non-Jews in his book Nazis and Good Neighbors: The United States Campaign against the Germans of Latin America in World War II: "Here was the creation of camps set up deliberately outside of the legal system in order to intern people suspected of subversion against whom there very little evidence. So it was an illegal operation that wound up being counterproductive and a violation of human rights, and it was sort of swept under the rug after the war." He further explains what he believes the mistakes were that the U.S. made in an effort to prevent an outbreak of Hitler supporters in the south and to avoid enemy aliens. He also describes the community and living conditions of the internment camps located in Texas, Tennessee, North Dakota, Florida and Louisiana.

Outcome 
In 1943, after 2 years of detainment, the Jewish internees were finally paroled. Jewish families in other cities became parolees-at-large (becoming a 'sponsor' for a refugee) and spoke out for their freedom. By the end of the year, they were allowed to leave the camps but could not return to their home countries because the war had not yet ended. By 1944, only 6 Jews were left residing at Camp Algiers. Nazi supporting Germans were sent there soon after, and a former Hitler advisor was appointed as the head of the internee committee, which created an unsafe environment for the Jews that remained at Camp Algiers for the following 2 years.

Present day 
The owner of the camp is collaborating with private investors to secure financing and preserve much of the camp. Most of the buildings are decaying and collapsing, except for one, which has already been reconstructed and preserved by the Department of Homeland Security.

Coverage 
Due to the lack of coverage of the historical facility, many residents of the area are unaware of its history as an internment camp for Europeans trying to escape imprisonment during WWII. When asked about the history of the station, Border Patrol Agent Robert Rivet stated, "We've always been told here that the facility was used as an embarkation facility. The immigrant ships would come up the river, and pull over dockside. And the inspectors would go out and look for diseases on board the vessels and all for quarantine purposes. As far as some sort of camp, I've never heard that story."

References

World War II internment camps in the United States
History of New Orleans